Shyroke is an urban-type settlement in Kryvyi Rih Raion, Dnipropetrovsk Oblast of Ukraine. It hosts the administration of Shyroke settlement hromada, one of the hromadas of Ukraine. Population: 

Shyroke is located on the left bank of the Inhulets River, several kilometers south of the city of Kryvyi Rih.

Until 18 July 2020, Shyroke was the administrative center of Shyroke Raion. The raion was abolished in July 2020 as part of the administrative reform of Ukraine, which reduced the number of raions of Dnipropetrovsk Oblast to seven. The area of Shyroke Raion was merged into Kryvyi Rih Raion.

Economy

Transportation
Shyroke is connected by a road with Kryvyi Rih. It also has access to the highway connecting Kropyvnytskyi and Zaporizhia via Kryvyi Rih and Nikopol.

References

Urban-type settlements in Kryvyi Rih Raion
Khersonsky Uyezd